The Orós Dam or President Juscelino Kubitschek Dam (Portuguese: Barragem Presidente Juscelino Kubitschek de Oliveira) is located on the Jaguaribe River, in the northeastern Brazilian state of Ceará.

It has a capacity of 2.1 billion cubic meters, making it the second largest reservoir in the state. Completed in 1961, it was the largest dam in Ceará until the completion of the Castanhão Dam in 2003.

See also 
Orós (municipality)

External links 
Map from Companhia de Pesquisa de Recursos Minerais (CPRM)

References 

Dams completed in 1961
Dams in Ceará
1961 establishments in Brazil